David McLeish (born 21 February 1950) is a former Australian rules footballer who played for South Melbourne in the VFL during the 1970s.

External links

1950 births
Living people
Australian rules footballers from Victoria (Australia)
Sydney Swans players